Benoît Trémoulinas (born 28 December 1985) is a French former professional footballer who played as a left-back.

Trémoulinas began his career at Bordeaux, making 200 appearances across all competitions and winning five pieces of silverware from all four domestic honours. He also played abroad with Dynamo Kyiv and Sevilla, winning the UEFA Europa League with the latter. He was forced to retire through injury in 2019.

Club career

Bordeaux

Trémoulinas was born in the Bordeaux, Gironde, and began his career playing with US Lormont. In 1994, he signed a youth contract with Bordeaux, spending approximately seven years in the club's youth system and one year in the Championnat de France Amateur before earning a call up to the senior team in preparation for the 2007–08 season following the signing of his professional contract.

Trémoulinas received the number 28 shirt and served as backup to the younger Florian Marange and elder Franck Jurietti. He made his professional debut on 15 August 2007 in a league match against Le Mans, and was limited to only nine league appearances, but was a regular in the club's 2007–08 UEFA Cup campaign appearing in seven matches and also scoring his first European goal in a 3–2 victory over Greek club Panionios.

Trémoulinas was slowly integrated into the squad for the 2008–09 season by manager Laurent Blanc, overtaking both Marange and Jurietti (though the latter was still relied more upon in important matches, such as when he started for Trémoulinas in matches against Paris Saint-Germain, Lyon, and the 2009 Coupe de la Ligue Final). He did appear in the final as a substitute in the 17th minute for the injured Brazilian Wendel, but had to substitute out at halftime, also due to injury. Bordeaux won the match 4–0 giving Trech, as he is called by the Bordeaux faithful, his first career club honour.

Following the final, Trémoulinas started the final five matches of the season, helping Bordeaux win their first league title since 1999. In total with the team, he appeared in 31 matches scoring his only goal of the season against Guingamp in a 4–2 victory in the Coupe de la Ligue. On 29 May 2009, he signed a contract extension until June 2013.

Trémoulinas appeared regularly during the 2009–10 season, and attracted interest from Italian clubs AC Milan, Juventus and Fiorentina, and Spanish club Real Madrid, quickly denying all rumours. He was among the top assists providers in the league, primarily due to his crosses and ability to get forward.

Abroad

On 12 July 2013, Trémoulinas signed a four-year contract with the Ukrainian club Dynamo Kyiv. He made his debut for the club sixteen days later in a 2–0 win against Sevastopol, spending 70 minutes on the pitch and also setting up one of the goals.

On 31 January 2014, Trémoulinas was loaned out to Saint-Étienne until the end of the season, after falling down the pecking order while at Dynamo. On 8 July 2014, he returned to his parent club, after appearing in 12 matches.

On 24 August 2014, Trémoulinas signed a three-year contract with La Liga club Sevilla, initially as a replacement for Liverpool-bound Alberto Moreno. He made ten appearances as they won the UEFA Europa League in his first season, including the 3–2 win over Dnipro in the final in Warsaw. In May 2017, Trémoulinas announced he would leave the club upon the expiry of his contract.

On 14 February 2019, Trémoulinas announced his retirement as a professional player after struggling with knee injuries.

International career
Trémoulinas was born in France and is of Indo-Reunnionais, and Malagasy descent. On 5 August 2010, Trémoulinas was called up to the senior team for the first time by new manager Laurent Blanc for the team's friendly against Norway on 11 August 2010. However, he did not play that game but he was called up again more than two years after by Didier Deschamps for a friendly game against Italy scheduled on 15 November 2012 in which he replaced Moussa Sissoko at the 89th minute of the game achieving his first international selection.

Career statistics

Club

International

Honours
Bordeaux
Ligue 1: 2008–09
Coupe de France: 2012–13
Coupe de la Ligue: 2008–09
Trophée des Champions: 2008, 2009

Dynamo Kyiv
Ukrainian Premier League: 2014–15
Ukrainian Cup: 2013–14

Sevilla
UEFA Europa League: 2014–15, 2015–16

Individual
Ligue 1 Team of the Year: 2009–10

References

External links

 

1985 births
Living people
Footballers from Bordeaux
French footballers
France international footballers
Association football defenders
FC Girondins de Bordeaux players
FC Dynamo Kyiv players
AS Saint-Étienne players
Sevilla FC players
Ligue 1 players
La Liga players
Ukrainian Premier League players
UEFA Europa League winning players
French expatriate footballers
Expatriate footballers in Spain
Expatriate footballers in Ukraine
French expatriate sportspeople in Spain
French expatriate sportspeople in Ukraine
French sportspeople of Malagasy descent
Black French sportspeople
French people of Réunionnais descent